Karol Dombrovski (born 8 June 1991) is a Lithuanian biathlete of Polish ethnicity who has competed at the Biathlon World Cup.

Biathlon results
All results are sourced from the International Biathlon Union.

Olympic Games
0 medals

World Championships
0 medals

*During Olympic seasons competitions are only held for those events not included in the Olympic program.
**The single mixed relay was added as an event in 2019.

References

1991 births
Living people
Lithuanian people of Polish descent
Lithuanian male biathletes
Biathletes at the 2022 Winter Olympics
Olympic biathletes of Lithuania